Timothy Findley: Anatomy of a Writer is a Canadian television documentary film, directed by Terence Macartney-Filgate and released in 1992. The film is a portrait of writer Timothy Findley, featuring both interview segments and scenes which try to illuminate his creative process by dramatizing several rewritten variations on his then-forthcoming theatrical play The Stillborn Lover as acted by William Hutt, Martha Henry and Susan Coyne.

The film was broadcast on CBC Television on January 30, 1992, as an episode of Adrienne Clarkson Presents.

The film won the Donald Brittain Award for best social or political documentary at the 7th Gemini Awards in 1993.

References

External links

1992 films
1992 documentary films
1992 television films
1992 LGBT-related films
Canadian documentary television films
Canadian LGBT-related television films
Documentary films about writers
Documentary films about gay men
Donald Brittain Award winning shows
National Film Board of Canada documentaries
1990s Canadian films